Mohammed Habib is a former Indian football player and captain, who played as a forward for the India national football team. He is considered as the 'First Professional Football player' in India.He is also considered by many Indians as one of the best Midfielders the country has ever produced.

Playing career

Santosh Trophy
Although hailing from the state of Andhra Pradesh (now Telangana), he represented Bengal in the Santosh Trophy. With Bengal in 1969, the team led by Santo Mitra, Habib won title. He finished as top-scorer with eleven goals, including two hat-tricks against Madras and Services.

Club career
In 1968, he joined Calcutta Football League club Mohun Bagan and played under "diamond coach" Amal Dutta, and won the 1969 IFA Shield with a 3–1 victory against East Bengal in the final.

As manager, he guided Mohammedan Sporting in domestic competitions from 1999 to 2000, 2000–2003 and 2005. He also managed Bengal Mumbai FC in the Mumbai Football League from 2007 to 2008.

International career
Habib represented India in international tournaments. He won a bronze medal at the 1970 Asian Games in Bangkok with Syed Nayeemuddin led, and P. K. Banerjee managed team.

Managerial career
After playing football, Habib became coach of the Tata Football Academy. He also acted as chief coach of the Indian Football Association academy in Haldia.

Honours
Bengal
Santosh Trophy: 1969

East Bengal
IFA Shield: 1970, 1974
Federation Cup: 1980–81

India
Asian Games Bronze Medal: 1970
Merdeka Tournament third place: 1970
Pesta Sukan Cup (Singapore): 1971

Mohun Bagan
Federation Cup: 1978–79

Individual
 Santosh Trophy top-scorer: 1969 (with 11 goals)

Awards
 Arjuna Award: 1980
 East Bengal "Bharat Gaurav Award": 2015
 Banga Bibhushan: 2018 (by the Government of West Bengal)

See also

 Arjuna award recipients among Indian footballers
 List of India national football team captains

References

Bibliography

External links
 All time Indian Football XI

Indian footballers
India international footballers
1949 births
Living people
Association football forwards
Footballers from Hyderabad, India
Asian Games bronze medalists for India
Asian Games medalists in football
Footballers at the 1970 Asian Games
Footballers at the 1974 Asian Games
Medalists at the 1970 Asian Games
Recipients of the Arjuna Award
East Bengal Club players
Mohun Bagan AC players
Mohammedan SC (Kolkata) players
Mohammedan SC (Kolkata) managers
Calcutta Football League players